This article refers to the last FarPoint Edition of the Spread Product line. Spread is now developed by GrapeCity, Inc. Since the acquisition, Spread for Biztalk Server has been removed from the product line and SpreadJS, a JavaScript version, has been added.

FarPoint Spread is a suite of Microsoft Excel-compatible spreadsheet components available for .NET, COM, and Microsoft BizTalk Server. Software developers use the components to embed Microsoft Excel-compatible spreadsheet features into their applications, such as importing and exporting Microsoft Excel files, displaying, modifying, analyzing, and visualizing data. Spread components handle spreadsheet data at the cell, row, column, or worksheet level.

History

 1991 Spread released as a DLL control as the initial product offering from FarPoint Technologies, Inc.
 1990s
 Spread VBX released.
 Spread ActiveX released.
 These components are now known as Spread COM.
 2003 Spread for Windows Forms released as a completely new managed C# version prompted by the launch of Visual Studio .NET.
 2003 Spread for Web Forms (now Spread for ASP.NET) released.
 2006 Spread for BizTalk released.
 2009 FarPoint Technologies acquired by GrapeCity.

Versions

 Spread for Windows Forms: 5.0
 Spread for Web Forms: 5.0
 Spread COM: 8.0
 Spread for BizTalk: 3.0

Spread for Windows Forms

FarPoint Spread for Windows Forms is a Microsoft Excel-compatible spreadsheet component for Windows Forms applications developed using Microsoft  Visual Studio and the .NET Framework. Developers use it to add grids and spreadsheets to their applications, and to bind them to data sources. In version 4.0, new cell types were added to display barcodes and fractions, and exports for XML and PDF were added.

Spread for ASP.NET

FarPoint Spread for ASP.NET is a Microsoft Excel-compatible spreadsheet component for ASP.NET applications. Developers use it to add grids and spreadsheets to their applications,

Spread for COM

FarPoint Spread 8 COM allows COM and ActiveX applications to incorporate spreadsheet features. In the 1997 book Visual Basic 5 for Windows for Dummies, Wally Wang lists an early version of Spread COM in Chapter 35: The Ten Most Useful Visual Basic Add-On Programs.

Spread for BizTalk

FarPoint Spread for BizTalk Server allows developers to integrate Microsoft Excel documents into Microsoft BizTalk applications. Spread for BizTalk Server includes two components:

 Spreadsheet Pipeline Disassembler - Parses data from Microsoft Excel (XLS and Excel 2007 XML, CSV, TXT) documents into XML data for processing through Microsoft BizTalk Server receive pipelines.
 Spreadsheet Pipeline Assembler - Assembles data from Microsoft BizTalk applications into Microsoft Excel (XLS or Excel 2007 XML) or PDF documents for transport through Microsoft BizTalk Server send pipelines.

Developers find it a useful tool for organizations with Microsoft BizTalk Server Enterprise Application Integration. Prior to this release, BizTalk users wanting to use Excel data had to manually open the files and copy and paste data between the two applications.

Features

These features are common to all versions.

 Predefined cell types, including:
 currency
 date time
 number
 percent
 regular expression
 button
 check box
 combo box
 hyperlink
 image
 Formula support, including:
 cross-sheet referencing
 over 300 built-in functions
 Import and export:
 import to Microsoft Excel-compatible files
 export to Microsoft Excel-compatible files
 export to HTML files
 export to XML files
 Design-time spreadsheet designer
 Data-binding with customizable options
 Hierarchical data views, with parent rows and child views
 Grouping of rows or columns
 Sorting by row or column on multiple keys
 Cell spanning
 Multiple row and column headers
 Bound and unbound modes

Version-Specific Features

Spread for Windows Forms

 Support for Microsoft Visual Studio 2010
 Support for Windows Azure AppFabric
 Integrated chart control
 Custom cell types
 Cell notes
 Child controls
 Splitter bars
 Built-in and custom skins and styles
 PDF export
 Microsoft Excel 2007 XML Support (Office Open XML, XLSX)
 Floating Formula Bar
 Range Selection for Formula
 Automatic Completion (type ahead)

Spread for ASP.NET

 Support for Microsoft Visual Studio 2010
 Support for Windows Azure AppFabric
 Integrated chart control
 AJAX-enabled
 Support for Open Document Format (ODF) files
 Multiple edits on multiple rows without server round trips
 Client-side column and row resizing
 Load on demand, which loads data from the server as needed for viewing
 Native Microsoft Excel import and export
 In-cell editing
 Multiple edits on multiple rows without server round trips
 Client-side column and row resizing
 Multiple sheets
 Searching
 Filtering
 Validations
 Cell spans
 PDF export
.

Spread COM

 Custom cell types
 Cell notes
 Virtual mode for data loading
 Unicode support
 Customizable printing
 Text tips
 Import and export:
 Microsoft Excel 97
 Excel 2000
 Excel 2007 (requires the .NET Framework)
 Enhanced printing
 64 bit DLL

Spread for BizTalk

 Integration of Microsoft Excel data into Microsoft BizTalk applications
 Design-time spreadsheet schema wizard and spreadsheet format designer

Supported document formats

 Adobe Portable Document Format PDF (*.pdf)
 HTML Web Page (*.html)
 Microsoft Excel Workbook (*.xls)
 Plain Text (*.txt)
 Comma-Separated Values (*.csv)
 Open Document Format (Spread for ASP.NET)

References

External links
 

Programming tools
Spreadsheet software